"Cleanin' Out My Closet" is a song by American rapper Eminem from his album The Eminem Show (2002). "Cleanin' Out My Closet" was the second single released off the album following "Without Me". Unlike the preceding single which was as his humorous Slim Shady persona, "Cleanin' Out My Closet" was a serious song inspired by the events of Eminem's childhood and relationships. It depicts Eminem venting his anger towards his mother, Debbie Mathers, for the way she raised him. In the chorus, Eminem sarcastically apologizes to his mother for hurting her and making her cry, but takes it back by showing the world what his mother, according to him, was like.

It became the second top-ten single from the album, reaching number four on the U.S. Billboard Hot 100, and one of the highest-charting singles of his career. It was certified Platinum in Australia. "Cleanin' Out My Closet" was also used in the initial theatrical trailer to Eminem's film 8 Mile, released in November 2002, but was not included on the film's soundtrack.

Background
The instrumental for "Cleanin' Out My Closet" was created by Eminem during the making of D12's debut studio album, Devil's Night. According to group member Kuniva, Bizarre was on the song first, but was talking "crazy" on the record and was encouraged to tone it down. Despite receiving the approval of Dr. Dre, Bizarre decided to pass on the record, and Eminem picked it up from there: "The whole group was like 'Yo, you can't say this shit. It's too much.' So, he got a call from Dr. Dre. And Dre was like 'Say that shit, man. You gotta say it.' [...] He ultimately gave into the group and was like 'You know what? Fuck it, man.'"

Composition
"Cleanin' Out My Closet" is a hip hop and rap rock song written and produced by Eminem and Jeff Bass, the latter of whom provided the guitars, bass, and keyboards. The song's drum programming was handled by DJ Head. At the beginning of the song, after the music begins to play, Eminem asks "Where's my snare? I have no snare in my headphones." Eminem explained that this actually happened; the recording engineer had muted the snare drums in his headphones during the recording of the song. When editing the song, Eminem chose to leave it in the song.

In the song's first verse, Eminem criticizes his mother. The second verse then moves on to how his father abandoned him and his mother did drugs. At the start of the third verse, Eminem states that his comments regarding his mother are not made for the sake of public attention.

Critical reception
Allmusic highlighted this song. David Browne was lukewarm: "The unhealed scars of his childhood are pored over in Cleanin' Out My Closet: In the chorus, he apologizes for making his mama cry, but in the verses, he lashes out at her (you selfish bitch) and vows to be a better dad than his own absentee father (I wonder if he even kissed me goodbye). The song is both fragile and furious, and the syncopated music-box arrangement matches it in tension." J-23 was positive: "Cleanin' Out My Closet" features the album's most personal rhymes as he lets us know just how he feels about his parents. His third verse, dealing with his mother, is truly something to behold." NME also praised the single: "Cleanin' Out My Closet", a stunning outpouring of grief-stricken anger against his mother." RapReviews agreed: "The jokes don't last very long though, because Eminem's next song "Cleanin' Out My Closet" is a direct attack on his mother for not really being one." Rolling Stone praised the song's production: "Cleanin' Out My Closet" feature electric-guitar rhythms fraternizing with hip-hop-sensible drum patterns" and he noted that his (Eminem's) relationship with his estranged mother creates "Cleanin' Out My Closet," possibly the record's most powerful moment."

Personnel 
All personnel taken from Tidal

 Eminem - vocals
 Jeff Bass - bass guitar, guitar, keyboards
 DJ Head - drum programming

Remixes and mashups
Two remixes of the song feature as European bonus tracks on the Straight from the Lab mixtape later released as a compilation: a Drum and bass remix (which was produced by DJ Green Lantern) and a remix combining the song with "God is a Girl" by Groove Coverage entitled "(God Is) Cleanin' Out My Closet."

In the mashup video "Atomic Closet" (a fusion of Eminem's original "Cleaning Out My Closet" and Blondie's "Atomic"), Blondie's hit was heavily sampled as the background song, with Eminem rapping throughout. The video was directed by Dr. Dre and Philip Atwell.

The B side "Stimulate" appears on the deluxe edition bonus disc of the soundtrack Music from and Inspired by the Motion Picture 8 Mile, and also appears on Straight from the Lab.

The song was mashed up with "Hotel California" by The Eagles, which appears on DJ Vlad and Roc Raida's mashup mixtape, Rock Phenomenon.

Jon Connor's 2012 mixtape The People's Rapper LP included a remix of the song, as well as other Eminem remixes.

Cover versions
In October 2012, New York City hip hop artist Angel Haze released a reworked version of "Cleanin' Out My Closet" using their own lyrics, in which they graphically recount their experience with child sexual abuse.

Apology song

Eminem's 2013 album, The Marshall Mathers LP 2, featured a song titled "Headlights" which serves as an apology to Eminem's mother for things he said about her in his songs, "Cleanin’ Out My Closet" being the only song mentioned by name. The music video, directed by Academy Award-winning director Spike Lee, shows Eminem's rise to fame through his mother's eyes. In the song, Eminem says he no longer plays "Cleanin’ Out my Closet" at shows and says he cringes every time he hears it on the radio.

Awards and nominations

Track listing
Digital download

UK CD single

UK Cassette

UK DVD

German CD single

German CD single

Maxi #1 International Version

Charts

Weekly charts

Year-end charts

Certifications

References

External links

Eminem songs
2002 singles
Songs about poverty
Songs about child abuse
Songs about parenthood
Songs about domestic violence
Songs about drugs
Songs written by Eminem
Song recordings produced by Eminem
Shady Records singles
Aftermath Entertainment singles
Interscope Records singles
2002 songs
Hardcore hip hop songs
Rap rock songs
Songs about mothers